Minot Public Schools (MPS) is a system of publicly funded K-12 schools in Minot, North Dakota.  There are thirteen elementary schools, three middle schools, and a high school on three campuses (one campus being an alternative high school). Three schools (two elementary & one middle school) are located on Minot AFB, fifteen miles north.  Minot City Transit provides busing service.

Schools

Elementary schools
Bell school
Bel Air
Dakota (on Minot AFB)
Edison
John Hoeven
Lewis & Clark
Longfellow
McKinley
North Plains (on Minot AFB)
Perkett
Roosevelt
Sunnyside
Washington

Middle schools
Erik Ramstad
Jim Hill
Memorial (on Minot AFB)

High school
Minot High School
Magic City Campus - (for 11th & 12th grade students)
Central Campus - (for 9th & 10th grade students)
Souris River Campus (alternative high school)

External links
Minot Public Schools website

Minot, North Dakota
School districts in North Dakota
Education in Ward County, North Dakota